( or , which literally translates to 'the devil's mountain') is a hill and nature reserve in the municipality of  in the Dutch province of Gelderland, near the border with Germany (North Rhine-Westphalia). It is politically significant, however, because  is the only part of the Netherlands that was both annexed from Germany and retained after World War II.

Location 
The  hill is located on a moraine east of Nijmegen, between Berg en Dal, Beek and the Dutch-German border. It is managed by the Staatsbosbeheer, the Dutch Forestry Commission.

History 

Over the centuries the hill has been militarily significant, this historical background in more recent times having given rise to issues of sovereignty between Germany and The Netherlands.

Military history from the Middle Ages until World War Two

In the Middle Ages Mergelp castle stood on the hill. In September 1944 airborne troops of the U.S. 508th Parachute Infantry Regiment fought to capture the Duivelsberg, "Hill 75.9", during Operation Market Garden.

Annexation issues

Until 1949, the hill was part of the nearby German village of Wyler in the municipality of Kranenburg. Duivelsberg's German name, Wylerberg, is derived from the name of this village. With the notable support of Dutch politician Frits Bakker Schut, Duivelsberg was one of the many small areas the Netherlands annexed from Germany on 23 April 1949. Unlike the other areas, Duivelsberg was not returned to the German authorities on 1 August 1963 and remained Dutch territory. The Nijmegen-born politician Marinus van der Goes van Naters, who also lived in nearby Nijmegen during the negotiations with Germany, successfully urged that the nature reserve be kept Dutch.

Ownership and conservation

The Duivelsberg was inherited in 1906 by Marie Schuster-Hiby who, between 1921 and 1924, built an expressionist villa designed by the German architect Otto Bartning. In 1965 the Schuster-Hiby family sold the villa to the Dutch State. Since 1985 the Huis Wylerberg has been a nationally protected building in which conservation organizations are located.

See also

 Wyler, North Rhine-Westphalia
 Marinus van der Goes van Naters#German border issues after WW2

References

Geography of Berg en Dal (municipality)
Nature reserves in the Netherlands
Operation Market Garden